David Adams and Jeff Tarango were the defending champions, but lost in first round to Pablo Albano and Sebastián Prieto.

Nicklas Kulti and Mikael Tillström won the title by defeating Andrea Gaudenzi and Diego Nargiso 4–6, 6–2, 6–3 in the final.

Seeds

Draw

Draw

External Links
 Official Results Archive (ATP)
 Official Results Archive (ITF)

Men's Doubles
Doubles